Paweł Szymczak (born 8 August 1978) is a Polish archer. He competed in the men's individual event at the 1996 Summer Olympics.

References

1978 births
Living people
Polish male archers
Olympic archers of Poland
Archers at the 1996 Summer Olympics
Sportspeople from Bydgoszcz